Albert Ehrenreich Gustav von Manstein (24 August 1805 in Willkischken – 11 May 1877 in Flensburg) was a Prussian general who served during the Austro-Prussian War and the Franco-Prussian War. He was the adoptive grandfather of Erich von Manstein.

Biography
Manstein entered the 3rd Infantry Regiment in 1822. In 1841 he was promoted to first lieutenant and he became an adjutant on the staff of the I Army Corps. By 1864 he had been promoted to the rank of Major General and given command of the 6th Infantry Division, which he led during the Second Schleswig War in the Battle of Dybbøl and at Als. During the Austro-Prussian War he commanded the reserve of the First Army, which he led during the battle of Königgrätz and for which he was awarded the Pour le Mérite. 

In 1867, Manstein was given command of IX Corps and was promoted to General der Infanterie in 1868. When the Franco-German War started in August 1870, IX Corps became part of the Second Army of Prince Friedrich Karl. Manstein and his Corps distinguished themselves at Gravelotte. After the fall of the Second Empire, Manstein fought in the Loire Valley in the campaigns at Orleans and Le Mans. For his services during the war he was awarded 100.000 thalers. He retired in 1873.

Honours and awards
  Kingdom of Prussia:
 Knight of the Order of the Red Eagle, 1st Class with Oak Leaves and Swords, 1864; Grand Cross with Oak Leaves and Swords on Ring (50 years), 3 October 1872
 Pour le Mérite (military), 21 April 1864; with Oak Leaves, 20 September 1866
 Service Award Cross
 Iron Cross (1870), 1st Class with 2nd Class on Black Band
 Grand Commander's Cross of the Royal House Order of Hohenzollern, with Swords and in Diamonds, 16 June 1871
 Knight of the Order of the Black Eagle, 29 July 1873
 : Knight of the Military Order of Maria Theresa, 1864
 :
 Grand Cross of the Ludwig Order
 Military Merit Cross
  Mecklenburg:
 Grand Cross of the House Order of the Wendish Crown, with Golden Crown
 Military Merit Cross, 1st Class (Schwerin)
 Cross for Distinction in War (Strelitz)
 : Knight of the Order of St. George, 4th Class, 27 December 1870

Footnotes

References

Howard, Michael, The Franco-Prussian War: The German Invasion of France 1870–1871, New York: Routledge, 2001. .
Poten, Berhard von: Manstein, Albrecht Ehrenreich Gustav v. in Allgemeine Deutsche Biographie (ADB). Band 20, Duncker & Humblot, Leipzig 1884, S. 248.

1805 births
1877 deaths
People from East Prussia
Generals of Infantry (Prussia)
German untitled nobility
Prussian military personnel of the Second Schleswig War
German military personnel of the Franco-Prussian War
Prussian people of the Austro-Prussian War
Recipients of the Pour le Mérite (military class)
Recipients of the Iron Cross (1870), 1st class
Recipients of the Military Merit Cross (Mecklenburg-Schwerin)
Knights Cross of the Military Order of Maria Theresa
Recipients of the Order of St. George of the Fourth Degree